Mangʻit (Манғит; , Маңғыт) is the seat of Amudaryo District in the autonomous republic of Karakalpakstan within Uzbekistan. Its population is 33,200 (2016).

History
Mangʻit was the site of battles during the Russian army's Khivan campaign of 1873. The first battle was slightly north of Mangʻit in the  morning of 20 May 1873 when Russian troops advancing south under General Nikolai Aleksandrovich Veryovkin were attacked Yomut Turkmen forces. After several fierce skirmishes, the Russians drove off the Turkmen cavalry, which retreated toward Mangʻit. Russian forces entered Mangʻit at 3 p.m. that day to find that the Yomuts had left. Russian troops did kill several Uzbek inhabitants who had remained and fired upon the invading force from the windows of houses in the town. 

Soviet Mangʻit was formally founded on 18 December 1957 and gained city status in 1973. As with much of the region, the economy is based on growing and processing cotton. The primary employers are a cotton ginning plant, household services, spinning and sewing shops, Mangit hydroelectric power plant, the gas district and printers. Mangʻit has general education schools, libraries, clubs and cultural centers, hospitals and other medical facilities.

Demographics

Climate

References

Sources

Populated places in Karakalpakstan
Cities in Uzbekistan
Turkmenistan–Uzbekistan border crossings
1957 establishments in the Soviet Union
Populated places established in 1957